From March 11 to June 5, 1956, voters of the Republican Party chose its nominee for president in the 1956 United States presidential election. Incumbent President Dwight D. Eisenhower was again selected as the nominee through a series of primary elections and caucuses culminating in the 1956 Republican National Convention held from August 20 to August 23, 1956, in San Francisco, California.

Eisenhower sought re-nomination and faced no formidable opposition. He swept the primaries without difficulty. Senator William F. Knowland of California was on the ballot for a number of them. Knowland had announced he would run if Ike would not, and the president announced so late that there was no time for Knowland to withdraw.

Candidates

Nominee

Withdrew
John W. Bricker, U.S. Senator from Ohio
William F. Knowland, U.S. Senator from California

Favorite sons
S. C. Arnold, Montana Secretary of State
Joe Foss, Governor of South Dakota

Polling

National polling

Results
Statewide contest won by candidates

a.

Total popular vote results 
Primaries total popular vote results
 Dwight Eisenhower - 5,008,132 (85.93%)
 John W. Bricker - 478,453 (8.21%)
 Unpledged - 115,014 (1.97%)
 William F. Knowland - 84,446 (1.45%)
 Joe Foss - 59,374 (1.02%)
 S.C. Arnold - 32,732 (0.56%)
 Others - 50,283 (0.86%)

See also
1956 Democratic Party presidential primaries

External links
 Republican Party Platform of 1956, The American Presidency Project

References